Transjordan may refer to:
 Transjordan (region), an area to the east of the Jordan River
 Oultrejordain, a Crusader lordship (1118–1187), also called Transjordan
 Emirate of Transjordan, British protectorate (1921–1946)
 Hashemite Kingdom of Transjordan, a former name (1946–1949) for the Hashemite Kingdom of Jordan

See also
 Transjordan in the Bible, an area east of the Jordan River mentioned in the Hebrew Bible
 The East Bank of the Jordan (poem)